At the start of 1945, Billboard magazine published a chart ranking the "most popular records in Harlem" under the title of the Harlem Hit Parade.  Placings were based on a survey of record stores primarily in the Harlem district of New York City, an area which has historically been noted for its African American population and called the "black capital of America".  This chart was published for the final time in the issue dated February 10.  The following week the magazine launched a new chart in its place, Most Played Juke Box Race Records, based not on retail sales but on the number of times songs had been played in jukeboxes, although records' peak positions and numbers of weeks on chart were carried over; "race records" was a term then in common usage for recordings by black artists.  The two charts are considered part of the lineage of the magazine's multimetric R&B chart, which since 2005 has been published under the title Hot R&B/Hip Hop Songs.

In the issue of Billboard dated January 6, the Ink Spots and Ella Fitzgerald topped the Harlem Hit Parade with "Into Each Life Some Rain Must Fall", retaining the top spot from the previous week.  The song remained at number one through the issue dated February 3 for a final total of 11 weeks atop the chart.  It was displaced by "Somebody's Gotta Go" by Cootie Williams and his Orchestra on the final chart published under the Harlem Hit Parade title.  It was the first number one for Williams but would prove to be the final charting song of his career.  The following week, Pvt. Cecil Gant topped the first Most Played Juke Box Race Records listing with "I Wonder".  Gant spent two weeks at number one before being displaced by Roosevelt Sykes with his recording of the same song.  Both versions would be the only number one for their respective artists.

The only act with more than one number one in 1945 was Louis Jordan and his Tympany Five, who spent a single week atop the chart with "Mop! Mop!" in April and six weeks in the top spot with "Caldonia" beginning in June.  Having first reached number one in 1943, Jordan was by far the most successful artist of the 1940s on Billboards R&B charts.  His tally of 18 chart-toppers was a record which would stand until the 1980s, and he spent 113 weeks at number one, a record which would still stand in the 21st century.  Jordan's success fell away in the 1950s, but his music is considered to have been hugely influential on the development of both R&B and rock and roll.  In the issue of Billboard dated September 8, Joe Liggins and his Honeydrippers reached number one with "The Honeydripper" (Parts 1 & 2), which remained atop the chart for the rest of the year.  The track would spend one further week in the top spot in 1946 for a final total of 18 weeks at number one, a record for an R&B chart-topper which would be equalled by Louis Jordan in 1946 and Drake in 2016 but not broken until "Old Town Road" by Lil Nas X spent a 19th week atop the modern Hot R&B/Hip Hop Songs chart in 2019.

Chart history

Harlem Hit Parade

Most Played Juke Box Race Records

Notes
a.  Jordan's first 16 number ones occurred at a time when Billboard published only one R&B chart.  His final two number ones occurred during a period when the magazine published two charts and each topped both listings, but the figure of 113 weeks at number one does not double-count weeks when he topped both.

References

1945
1945 record charts
1945 in American music